Euclides Gomes Vaz (born 19 May 1983), known as Bebé, is a Portuguese futsal player who plays as a goalkeeper for Leões de Porto Salvo and the Portugal national team.

Honours

Club
Sporting CP
 Liga Portuguesa: 2003–04, 2005–06
 Taça de Portugal: 2005–06
 Supertaça de Portugal: 2004

Benfica
 Liga Portuguesa: 2006–07, 2007–08, 2008–09, 2011–12, 2014–15
 Taça de Portugal: 2006–07, 2008–09, 2011–12, 2014–15, 2016–17
 Supertaça de Portugal: 2007, 2009, 2011, 2012, 2015, 2016
 UEFA Futsal Cup: 2009–10

International
Portugal
FIFA Futsal World Cup: 2021
UEFA Futsal Championship: 2018, 2022

External links
 

1983 births
Living people
Sportspeople from Lisbon
Futsal goalkeepers
Portuguese men's futsal players
Sporting CP futsal players
S.L. Benfica futsal players